The 2021 Georgia Tech Yellow Jackets football team represented the Georgia Institute of Technology during the 2021 NCAA Division I FBS football season. The Yellow Jackets were led by third-year head coach Geoff Collins. They played their home games at Bobby Dodd Stadium and compete as a member of the Atlantic Coast Conference (ACC).

Previous season
In a season limited due to the ongoing COVID-19 pandemic, the Yellow Jackets finished the 2020 season 3-7, 2-7 in ACC play to finish in 11th place.

Coaching staff

Schedule

Game summaries

vs. Northern Illinois

vs. Kennesaw State

at Clemson

vs. North Carolina

vs. Pittsburgh

at Duke

at Virginia

vs. Virginia Tech

at Miami(FL)

vs. Boston College

at Notre Dame

vs. Georgia

Players drafted into the NFL

References

Georgia Tech
Georgia Tech Yellow Jackets football seasons
Georgia Tech Yellow Jackets football